This article lists all power stations in Lebanon.

Thermal

Powerships 
In May 2021, Turkish Karadeniz Powership Co. ceased supplying electricity to Lebanon.

Hydroelectric

See also 
 List of largest power stations in the world

References 

Lebanon
Power stations